A statue of Josephus Daniels, the former publisher of the Raleigh News and Observer, was installed in 1985 at the east-facing edge of Raleigh, North Carolina's Nash Square, in the United States.

Description and history
The 8-foot (2.4 m) likeness stood on a 4-foot (1.2m) granite pedestal. It portrayed Daniels "in his trademark rumpled three-piece suit, holding his wide-brimmed hat at his left side and raising his right hand in the air as if waving to a friend peering out a second-floor window" of the News and Observer offices which were located across the street at the time of the installation. Daniels was a prominent white supremacist, and the building the statue was facing was scheduled for demolition, so the family decided on its own to remove the statue on June 16, 2020, and place it in storage.

References

1985 establishments in North Carolina
1985 sculptures
Buildings and structures in Raleigh, North Carolina
Monuments and memorials in North Carolina
Monuments and memorials removed during the George Floyd protests
Statues removed in 2020
Sculptures of men in North Carolina
Statues in North Carolina